The Wa National Army (abbreviated WNA) is an insurgent group that operates in Shan State, Myanmar (Burma), near Myanmar's border with Thailand. It is the armed wing of the Wa National Organisation (WNO).

History
The WNA was founded along with the WNO on 29 July 1974, after the original group, a Ka Kwe Ye, joined forces with the Shan State Army (SSA) and Lo Hsing Han. The group was led by Mahasang, the son of the last sawbwa of Vingngun.

In 1977, the WNA broke ties with the SSA and allied themselves with the 3rd Kuomintang battalion operating near the Myanmar-China border, led by General Li Wenhuan. In 1983, the WNA's political wing, the Wa National Organisation, officially joined the National Democratic Force (NDF).

In the 1980s, the WNA operated in northern Shan State, near the Myanmar-Thailand border, but not in the mountainous areas of the region, which were under the control of the Communist Party of Burma until 1989. 

In August 1997, the WNA signed a peace agreement with the military junta government.

See also
 Shan State Army
 United Wa State Army

References

Wa people
Rebel groups in Myanmar
Paramilitary organisations based in Myanmar